Sibbick is a surname. Notable people with the surname include:

Lucy Sibbick, British special effects make-up artist
Toby Sibbick (born 1999), British footballer